Henry II may refer to:

Kings 
Henry II of England (1133–89), reigned from 1154
Henry II of Jerusalem and Cyprus (1271–1324), reigned from 1285; king of Jerusalem in name only from 1291
Henry II of Castile (1334–79), reigned 1366–67 and from 1369
Henry II of Navarre (1503–55), reigned from 1518
Henry II of France (1519–59), reigned from 1547
Henry II of Sicily (also known as Henry II, Duke of Swabia and Henry (VII) of Germany), king of Germany (Rex romanorum) and of Sicily (1211–42)

Others 
Saint Henry II, Holy Roman Emperor (972–1024), crowned King of Germany in 1002, of Italy in 1004 and Emperor in 1014
Henry II, Duke of Bavaria (951–995)
Henry II, Count of Louvain (d. 1071)
Henry II, Duke of Carinthia (1090–1122)
Henry II, Margrave of Meissen (1103–1123)
Henry II, Duke of Saxony, better known as Henry X, Duke of Bavaria (1108–1139)
Henry II, Duke of Austria (1107–77)
Henry II, Count of Champagne (1166–97)
Henry II the Pious, Piast Duke of Silesia-Wrocław, Kraków and Southern Greater Poland (ca. 1196–9 April 1241)
Henry II, Count of Sayn (1202–46)
Henry II, Duke of Brabant (1207–48)
Henry II, Count of Nassau (d. 1251)
Henry II, Prince of Anhalt-Aschersleben (d. 1266)
Henry II of Mecklenburg (1266–1329)
Henry II, Duke of Świdnica (1316–45)
Henry II, Duke of Brunswick-Lüneburg (d. after 1351)
Henry II, Landgrave of Hesse (d. 1376)
Henry II, Duke of Münsterberg  (c. 1396–1420)
Henry II, Duke of Münsterberg-Oels (1507–1548)
Henry II, Duke of Lorraine (1563–1624)
Henri II de Montmorency (1595–1632)
Henry II de Bourbon, prince de Condé (1588–1646)
Henry II, Duke of Guise (1614–1664)
Jacques-Victor Henry, Prince Royal of Haiti, pretender to the throne of Haiti as Henry II (1820)